Crown King is an unincorporated community in Yavapai County, Arizona, United States, located at an elevation of 5,771 feet (1,759 m).  Crown King has a ZIP Code of 86343; in 2000, the population of the 86343 ZCTA was 133. The site of a former gold mining town, Crown King is 28 miles west of Interstate 17 on Senator Highway, high in the Bradshaw Mountains. The community is named after the Crowned King mine, but the name was shortened to Crown King in 1888. Horsethief Basin Lake resides 6.5 miles southeast of Crown King on Crown King Rd/Forest 259 Rd.

History 

An estimated US$2,000,000 in gold was taken from the Crowned King Mine alone; the mines have been closed since the 1950s and for the past half-century tourism has been the only reliable source of income in the area, despite the fact that the unpaved, mountainous access roads are rocky, rough and slow to drive.

The first recorded gold claim in Crown King was "Buckeye" and was filed by Rod McKinnon on July 1, 1875. Over the next 40 years, more than 15 mines or claims were made in the area. At its height, the town had 500 buildings, including several company stores and boarding houses, two Chinese restaurants and a post office. The town was electrified by 1897 and had one telephone at that time.

While an active mining town, Crown King was served by the Bradshaw Mountain Railroad. Rail service to the area began in 1904 upon completion of "Murphy's Impossible Railroad" – a series of switchbacks and trestles that ascended the mountain terrain between Cleator and Crown King. The railroad began in Mayer, Arizona, connecting with Murphy's Prescott and Eastern Railroad and extended for 28 miles amid the rocky terrain.

Crown King was the terminus (1904–1926) of the railroad, built by Frank M. Murphy to serve the mines of the southern Bradshaw Mountains. However, these mines were never very productive, and the BMRR was a financial failure. The line was abandoned in 1926. Much of the road to Crown King uses the old railroad bed.

Of the buildings still standing and in use in Crown King, the Crown King Saloon has maintained its place as the center of activity in town. The Saloon was originally constructed and operated in the nearby mining town of Oro Belle (now also a ghost town). In 1910, it was disassembled and brought to Crown King piece by piece after the mine at Oro Belle had played out. The building was home to a brothel and bar in both towns and now serves the public as a hotel, cafe, and bar. The town has a cemetery nearby.

The red one-room schoolhouse was built in 1917 and still serves a small number of K–8 students. High school students typically leave town to attend class 14 miles away in Mayer.

The post office was established on July 29, 1888, and was discontinued on May 15, 1954. It has since reopened inside the Crown King General Store.

Climate
According to the Köppen climate classification system, Crown King has a Mediterranean climate, classified as Csb on climate maps. It is atypical of this type because its dry season only covers the first half of summer and is followed by heavy monsoonal thunderstorms in July and August.

Snowfall can be heavy, with  falling in January 1949, although in general snow cover is minimal due to relatively warm days in winter.

References

Further reading
 Bruce M. Wilson, Crown King and the Southern Bradshaws: A Complete History, Mesa, Crown King Press, 1990, 104 pages.

External links
 Crown King – ghosttowns.com
 

Unincorporated communities in Yavapai County, Arizona
Populated places established in 1875
1875 establishments in Arizona Territory
Unincorporated communities in Arizona
Ghost towns in Arizona
Cemeteries in Arizona